Alexander Muirhead, FRS, (26 May 1848 – 13 December 1920) born in East Saltoun, East Lothian, Scotland was an electrical engineer specialising in wireless telegraphy.

Biography
Muirhead studied for his Bachelor of Science at University College London and then DSc (in electricity) at St Bartholomew's Hospital 1869–1872 where he is credited with recording the first human electrocardiogram. He was scientific adviser to his father's company, Latimer Clark, Muirhead & Co., designing precision instruments, and with H A Taylor patented a method of duplexing telegraph signals for use in submarine cables.  He later worked with Sir Oliver Lodge on the development of wireless telegraphy, selling their important tuning patents to Marconi in 1912. He became a member of the Institution of Electrical Engineers in 1877, and was elected a Fellow of the Royal Society in 1904. He died at Shortlands, Kent, on 13 December 1920 and is buried at West Norwood Cemetery.

References

External links
 Ronald Birse, rev. Patricia Knowlden Alexander Muirhead Oxford Dictionary of National Biography (Subscription required)

1848 births
1920 deaths
19th-century British inventors
English electrical engineers
Alumni of University College London
Alumni of the Medical College of St Bartholomew's Hospital
Fellows of the Royal Society
Burials at West Norwood Cemetery
People educated at University College School
19th-century British engineers
People from East Lothian